Greek rappers

Imiskoumbria (Greek: Ημισκούμπρια), also known as Imiz, is a comedy hip hop group from Athens, Greece. The group's roster has been the same since its inception in 1996. Imiz members include rapper Dimitris Mentzelos (Greek: Δημήτρης Μεντζέλος, born 1968), Mithridatis (born Mithridatis Hatzihatzoglou; Greek: Μιθριδάτης Χατζηχατζόγλου, born 1975) and DJ Pritanis (born Kostas Kostakos; Greek: Κώστας Κωστάκος, born 1972). They are widely credited for the establishment of hip-hop within Greek music show business.

Name
Ημισκούμπρια has been translated as semi-mackerels. Σκουμπρί is the Greek word for the fish mackerel (cmpr Scombridae) and is sometimes used in slang for elusive persons. The first element ημι- is analogous to the formal prefix "semi-" (in contrast to the colloquial μισό "half"). Hence the name refers to half-elusive guys. The combination of these two elements is used mainly for comedic effect rather than being meaningful.

Discography

Albums
30 Χρόνια Επιτυχίες (30 Khronia Epitikhies/30 Years of Hits) - 1996, FM Records, HMI-Rec
Ο Δίσκος που Διαφημίζετε (O Dhiskos pu Dhiafimizete/The Record That you are Advertising) - 1997, FM Records, HMI-Rec
Στενές Επαφές με Τρεις Τύπους (Stenes Epafes me Tris Tipus/Close Encounters with Three Guys) - 1998, FM Records, HMI-Rec
2030 - 1999, Def Jam/Universal, Imiz Biz 
Τη Λόλα Απ'τη Φωτιά Ποιός Θα τη Βγάλει; (Ti Lola ap'ti Fotia Pios Tha ti Vghali?/Who's Going to Get Lola Out of the Fire?) - 2001, Def Jam/Universal, Imiz Biz 
Γυναικολογίες (Yinekoloyies/Gynecologisms) - 2004, Minos/EMI, Imiz Biz 
Η Απλή Μέθοδος των Τριών (E Apli Methodhos ton Trion/The Simple Rule of Three) - 2006, Minos/EMI, Imiz Biz

Singles
Η Τσόντα (The Porn Flick) - 1996, FM Records, HMI-Rec 
Η Μαγική Τσατσάρα (The Magic Comb)(feat. U.N.E.E.K.) - 1998, FM Records
Νωρίς (Early) (feat. Loukianos Kilaidonis) - 1999
Πάμε όλοι μαζί σε μια παραλία (Let's All Go To A Beach) - 2001, Def Jam/Universal, Imiz Biz 
Πώς Να Αντιμετωπίσετε Το Σεισμό (How To Deal With The Earthquake) - 2003
Greek Lover - 2004, Minos/EMI, Imiz Biz 
Ήπια 15 (I Drank 15) - 2004, Minos/EMI, Imiz Biz 
Είναι Μόνο Εκλογές (They Are Just Elections) - 2004, Minos/EMI, Imiz Biz 
Πάφα Πούφα Το Τσιγάρο (Puff Puff The Cigarette) - 2007
Τα Χριστούγεννα Σημαίνουν (Christmas Means) - 2007, Minos/EMI, Imiz Biz 
Πώς να σου το πω (How Should I Tell You) - 2010, Universal, Imiz Biz 
Μια ιθαγενή (A Native) (feat. Psi) - 2011, Imiz Biz
Λε Χαμ (Le Ham) - 2016, Imiz Biz

Solo albums 
Αιρετικά Ερωτικός (Heretical Erotic) (Mithridatis) - 2009, Legend, Imiz Biz Ο Ράπερ Της Χρονιάς (Rapper Of The Year) (Dimitris Mentzelos) - 2011, Legend, Imiz Biz/Cenobite Productions/396 Rainlab/Ihokratoria

 Solo singles Ποτέ (Never) (Mithridatis) - 2009, Legend, Imiz BizΆγιε Βασίλη, Μην Ξηγιέσαι (Santa Claus Stop Trippin') (Mithridatis) - 2010, Imiz BizL.A., L.A. (Dimitris Mentzelos feat. Don Freaka) - 2012, Skull Records, Imiz Biz, Skull Records Όσα Και Να Πω (Whatever I Say) (Dimitris Mentzelos feat. Disastah) - 2012, Imiz BizΤρέχα, Μαδαφάκα, Τρέχα (Run, Motherfucker, Run) (Mithridatis) - 2012, Imiz BizΚρίση, Πτήση, Στύση (Crisis, Flight, Erection) (Dimitris Mentzelos feat. Tiny Jackal & Killah-P) - 2012, Imiz Biz Το Λένε Μουσική (It's Called Music) (Dimitris Mentzelos feat. Dagobah System) - 2012Σαλόνικα (Salonica) (Dimitris Mentzelos feat. Dodekatos Pithikos) - 2012, Imiz BizΝτου Γιου Λοβ Μι (Do You Love Me) (Mithridatis) - 2013, Imiz BizΜόνο Εσύ (Only You) (Mithridatis VS Christiana) - 2013, Imiz BizRock Rap Heavy (Dimitris Mentzelos & Prejudice Reborn) - 2013, Imiz BizΗ Νύφη (The Bride) (Mithridatis & Trendy HooliGuns) - 2014, Imiz Biz Σπιτουλίνι Αραχτουλίνι (Resting At Home) (Mithridatis) - 2014, Imiz BizΜόνο Κρέας (Meat Only) (TRIPA Crew & Pritanis) - 2015, Imiz Biz Έχω Πάρει Φωτιά (I'm On Fire) (Dimitris Mentzelos feat. Tasos Krokodeilos & Mavros Ilos) - 2015, Imiz BizΓλυκιά Ολντ'Σκουλιά (Sweet Old School) (Mithridatis) - 2017, Amok Time ArtsEl Gato Loco (Dimitris Mentzelos feat. Markos Koumaris) - 2018 Το Λάθος Άτομο (The Wrong Person) (Mithridatis) - 2018, Amok Time ArtsDarth Mith (Mithridatis) - 2019, Amok Time Arts

Other projects
Albums
La Klikaria - La Klikaria - 2000, Def Jam/Universal, Imiz Biz

Singles
La Klikaria - Κοίτα με (Look At Me) - 2000, Def Jam/Universal, Imiz Biz 
B-Sykes feat. Dimitris Mentzelos & El Zeraw - Greek Ladies - 2007, Imiz Biz 
Killah-P feat. Dimitris Mentzelos - Ρούμι Τεκίλα (Rum Tequila) - 2009
VHS feat. Dimitris Mentzelos - Ποιον Αγαπάς (Who Do You Love) - 2012
Etsi De feat. Dimitris Mentzelos - Ανομολόγητα (The Ones That Shouldn't Be Told) - 2013, Etsi De Productions 
Dimitris Mentzelos & Prejudice Reborn - Rock Rap Heavy - 2013, Imiz Biz
La Klikaria - #GoogleDatShit - 2015, Imiz Biz
Dimitris Mentzelos & Prejudice Reborn feat. Donald D - Scream Your Lungs Out - 2017, Hood Groove Management
Dimitris Mentzelos & Prejudice Reborn - Frankenstein (Chapter 1-The Creator) - 2017

EPs
Radicals - R.E.A.L. - 1993. FreeStyle Productions
FreeStyle Productions - FreeStyle Collection - 1994. FreeStyle Productions
Dimitris Mentzelos & Prejudice Reborn - Rock Rap Heavy - 2013. Imiz Biz Entertainment

 Compilations 
1998Το Hip Hop Δεν Σταματά (Hip Hop Doesn't Ever Stop)20002000 Millenium Edition2001Ημίζ Forevah (Imiz Forevah)2005Tha Def Jam Yearz2007Decade 96-06:Das Beste30 Χρόνια Επιτυχίες/Ο Δίσκος Που Διαφημίζετε (30 Years Of Hits/The LP That you are Advertising) Τα Σουξέ Του Δίσκου:The Best Of The Rest (The Hits Of The Disc:The Best Of The Rest)2008Πορτραίτα (Portraits) Appearances 

1994Το Hip Hop Δεν Σταματά (Hip Hop Doesn't Stop)1997Η Πτώση (The Fall) (Goin' Through feat. Imiskoumbria & Terror X Crew)Παραμένουμε Μουρλοί (We Remain Crazy)Προφυλακτικών Εγκώμιον (CondomEncomium) Αμφιθυμία (Ambivelence) (Dr. Dreez) (Whole Album Produced by Mithridatis & Mihalis Papathanasiou) Η Με Την Εκλίπουσα Φιλίαν (Friendship With The Departed) (Dr. Dreez) (Produced by Mithridatis) Dreezoni Dreezonaki (Dr. Dreez) (Produced by Mithridatis & Mihalis Papathanasiou)

1998Βραχυκύκλωμα (Short Circuit) (Vaggelis Germanos feat. Imiskoumbria) Dick Tracy (S.U.F.F.I.X. feat. Mithridatis)Η Πρώτη Επαφή (First Contact) (Pritanis Remix) (Goin' Through) (Produced by Pritanis)'

1999Ο Παπαγάλος (The Parrot)2000Φάρμακο (Medicine) (SoulBro feat. Imiskoumbria) Στόχος Είναι (The Goal Is) (Diodos) (Produced by Pritanis)Στρατιώτης Πεζικού (Infantry Soldier) (Diodos) (Produced by Pritanis)Το Πάρτυ Με Τα Ούζα (Party With Ouzo) (Kavourodeinosavroi) (Extra Vocals by Dimitris Mentzelos) Ο Φονιάς (The Killer) (Kavourodeinosavroi) (Produced and Backing Vocals by Pritanis)Διαφημιστικό (Commercial Spot) (Kavourodeinosavroi) (Vocals by Pritanis)

2001Πορτραίτο (Portrait) (Vasilis Kazoulis feat. Dimitris Mentzelos)Τι Γυρεύεις Μες Στην Κίνα Τζάκι Τσαν (What Are You Looking For In China Jackie Chan) (Manolis Rasoulis feat. Imiskoumbria) 10 Λεπτά Κήρυγμα (10 Minutes Of Preaching) (Kavourodeinosavroi) (Produced by Pritanis)

2004Ελεύθερη Σχέση (Open Relationship) (Pamela feat. Imiskoumbria)

2005Μπισκοτάκι Γεμιστό (Stuffed Biscuit) (Etsi De feat. Dimitris Mentzelos)Μίκυ Μάου (Mickey Mouse) (Etsi De feat. Imiskoumbria)Σέξυ Κοπελιά (Sexy Lady) (Sexpyr feat. Imiskoumbria)Ρίχτους Μια Τούρτα (Throw Them A Cake) (Sexpyr feat. Mithridatis)Sexpyrience (Sexpyr) (Whole Album Produced by Mithridatis, Pritanis & DJ Vanilla) Χάσμα Γενεών (Generation Gap) (Sexpyr feat. Dimitris Mentzelos) Ο Σοφός (The Wiseman) (Giannis Logothetis feat. Imiskoumbria)Η Αγάπη Θέλει Υπερβολή (Love Needs Hyperbole) (Valantis feat. Imiskoumbria)

2006Bling Bling Pt. 2 (Haji Mike feat. Imiskoumbria)

2007Είμαι Και Γ*μώ (I'm Awesome)(Sexpyr feat. Dimitris Mentzelos) Πίνω (I Drink) (Goin' Through feat. Dimitris Mentzelos)

2009Προσοχή Σκύλος Δαγκώνει (Warning The Dog Bites) (Lavrentis Machairitsas feat. Imiskoumbria) Θέλω Να Αγαπήσω Την Μπαργούμαν (I Want To Love The Barwoman) (TUS feat. Sexpyr & Mithridatis) Μπιρίμπα (Biriba) (Polina feat. Mithridatis) Πάλι Καλοκαίρι (Summer Again) (Mario Mental feat. Mithridatis & Elena Anagiotou)

2010Σε Πάρτυ RNB (At An RNB Party) (Cenobite feat. Dimitris Mentzelos) Είσαι Τρελός (You Are Mad) (Trendy Hooliguns feat. Dimitris Mentzelos)Μήνυμα ΔΜ (Delta Mee Message) (Dj The Boy feat. Dimitris Mentzelos) Καμιά Σαν Τη Ματίνα (Noone Like Matina) (Dj The Boy feat. Dimitris Mentzelos)Ο Βετεράνος (The Veteran) (Dj The Boy feat. Dimitris Mentzelos)

2011Γιατί; (Why?) (Sexpyr feat. Dimitris Mentzelos) Όλες Μοιάζουνε Πολύ (They Are All Very Similar) (Skies feat. Dimitris Mentzelos & Q.B. Mix)Θέλω Ένα Πάρτυ Με Τη Πάττυ (I Want A Party With Patty) (Apostoleas Loukakis) (Produced by Pritanis)Ραπ Τεχνικοί (Rap Technicians) (Sexpyr feat. Tafoplakioum) (Produced by Pritanis)Σαν Τη Γρανίτα (Like Granita) (Sexpyr feat. Alexandros Kontopidis) (Produced by Pritanis)Ο Ψαράς (The Fisherman) (Apostoleas Loukakis) (Produced by Pritanis)

2012Το Δικό Μου Hip Hop (My Hip Hop) (SMA feat. Dimitris Mentzelos)Αυτός Που Σε Σπάει (The One Who Breaks You) (Apostoleas Loukakis) (Produced by Pritanis)Πως Μ' Αγαπάς Πολύ (That You Love Me So Much (Apostoleas Loukakis) (Produced by Pritanis)

2013Σαλόνικα (Salonica) (DJ Tyler feat. Dimitris Mentzelos & Dodekatos Pithikos)Κύριε Μου (My Sir) (Trendy Hooliguns feat. Dimitris Mentzelos)Περαστικά (Get Better Soon) (Sigma Pi feat. Dimitris Mentzelos)

2014Καλοκαίρι Για Πάντα (Summer Forever) (Dimitris Mentzelos)

2015Μόνο Κρέας (Meat Only) (TRIPA Crew feat. Pritanis)

2016Έτσι Το Κάνουμε Εμείς (This Is How We Do It) (D-Light feat. Dimitris Mentzelos)

2017Έρχεται Καλοκαίρι Καυτό (Hot Summer On The Way) (Stelios MC feat. Dimitris Mentzelos)Party Made In Κρήτη (Party Made In Crete) (Al Yaida x Uncle Sam feat. Dimitris Mentzelos & Gogo Lidaki) Οι Δρόμοι (The Streets) (Dr. Dreez) (Co-Produced by Mithridatis)

 Music videos 
1996Το Βουκολικό (The Bucolic) (Music composed by Mithridatis) Η Τσόντα (The Porn Flick) (Music composed by Mithridatis)

1997Η Πτώση (The Fall) Goin' Through with Dimitris Mentzelos & Artemis MC (Terror X Crew) (Music composed by Mihalis Papathanasiou (Goin' Through)) Στην Ντισκοτέκ (In The Discothèque) with Elpida (Music composed by Kostas Tournas & Imiskoumbria) Ο Κύρης Του Σπιτιού (The Lord Of The House) (Music composed by Mithridatis & Pritanis)Je Suis Bossu with Foivos Dellivorias (Music composed by Mithridatis & Pritanis)Λέω Να Μην Πεθάνω (I'd Rather Not Die) Dr. Dreez (Music composed by Mithridatis & Mihalis Papathanasiou (Goin' Through)ΑΜΑΝ Ο Μπάρμαν (Oh That Barman) (Music composed by Imiskoumbria)

1998Η Μαγική Τσατσάρα (The Magic Comb) with UNEEK (Music composed by Imiskoumbria)ΜΕΘ Στο Βολαν (Drunk On The Steering) (Music composed by Pritanis)Δημόσιο Forevah (Public Forever) (Music composed by Mithridatis & Pritanis)Χορεύοντας Με Το Λίπος (Dancing With The Fat) (Music composed by AlphaVille & Mithridatis & Pritanis)

1999Πυρετός Το Σαββατόβραδο (Saturday Night Fever) with MLV (Music composed by Mithridatis & Pritanis)Νωρίς (Early) with Loukianos Kilaidonis (Music composed by Loukianos Kilaidonis, Imiskoumbria & Mihalis Papathanasiou (Goin' Through)Η Πεντάμορφη Και Ο Αστέρας (The Beauty And The Star) with Giannis Savvidakis (Music composed by Pritanis)Ο Παπαγάλος (The Parrot) (Music composed by Mithridatis & Prytanis)

2000Πιπινολάτρης Γερογόης (Young Girls Lover And Old Enchanter) Imiskoumbria & Mariletta (LA KLiKARiA) (Music composed by Pritanis)

2001Κοίτα Με (Look At Me) (Alithoria Mix) Imiskoumbria & Mariletta (LA KLiKARiA) (Music composed by Pritanis & Giorgos Papadimitriou)Πάμε Όλοι Μαζί Σε Μια Παραλία (Let's All Go To A Beach) with Mariletta (Music composed by Pritanis)Θέλω Να Το Κάνω Με Τη Μαμά Σου (I Wanna Do It With Your Mother) (Music composed by Mithridatis & Pritanis)Οι Λαϊκές (The Folksy Women) (Music composed by Mithridatis)Οι Κληρονόμοι (The Heirs) (Music composed by Mithridatis & Pritanis)

2003Σεισμός (Earthquake) (Music composed by Mithridatis & Pritanis)

2004Greek Lover (Music composed by Imiskoumbria)Το Σεξ (The Sex) (Music composed by Stamatis Kraounakis & Imiskoumbria)Ήπια 15 (I Drank 15) (P.I.M.P. Style/You Don't Stop Edition) with B-Sykes (Music composed by Pritanis)

2005Τζαμάικα (Jamaica) Sexpyr (Music composed by Mithridatis, Pritanis & DJ Vanilla)

2006Brazil - Imiz 1-0 (Music composed by Mithridatis & Mihalis Papathanasiou (Goin' Through)Αν Ήσουν Άλλος (If You Were Another Person) (Music composed by Mithridatis)Αντρικές Γουρουνιές/Το Σκληρό MP3 Του Δίσκου (The Hard MP3 Of The Disc) (Music composed by DJ Vanilla)

2007Τα Χριστούγεννα Σημαίνουν (Christmas Mean) (Music composed by Pritanis)Πάφα Πούφα Το Τσιγάρο (Puff Puff The Cigarette) (Music composed by Mithridatis & Pritanis)

2009Ποτέ (Never) Mithridatis (Music composed by Pritanis)Παγωτά (Ice Cream) Grigoris Kollias & Marios Tsagkaris with Mithridatis

2010Πώς Να Σου Το Πω (How Should I Say That To You) (Music composed by Pritanis) Άγιε Βασίλη, Μην Ξηγιέσαι (Santa Claus, Don't Act Like That) Mithridatis (Music composed by Pritanis)

2011Γιατί Δεν Μ' Αγαπάς Όπως Παλιά (Why Don't You Love Me) Dimitris Mentzelos with VHS (Music composed by Hank Williams)Α, Ρε Πατέρα (Oh, Father) Dimitris Mentzelos with Antigoni Katsouri (Music composed by DJ Alx)Ραπ Τεχνικοί (Rap Experts) Sexpyr with Tafoplakioum (Anorimoi) (Music composed by Pritanis)Σαν Τη Γρανίτα (Like The Water Ice) Sexpyr with Alexandros Kontopidis (Music composed by Pritanis)

2012L.A., L.A. Dimitris Mentzelos with Don Freaka (Music composed by Don Freaka)Όσα Και Να Πω (Whatever I Say) Dimitris Mentzelos with Disastah (SMA) (Music composed by DJ Space (SMA)Κρίση, Πτήση, Στύση (Crisis, Flight, Erection) Dimitris Mentzelos with Tiny Jackal & Killah-P (Music composed by Tiny Jackal)Ποιον αγαπάς? (Who Do You Love) VHS with Dimitris Mentzelos (Music composed by Spy BuonViaggio (VHS) & Pritanis)Τρέχα, Μαδαφάκα, Τρέχα (Run, Mothafucka, Run) Mithridatis (Music composed by DJ Tyler (Professional Sinnerz)Σαλόνικα (Salonica) Dimitris Mentzelos with Dodekatos Pithikos (Music composed by DJ Tyler (Professional Sinnerz)Πως Μ' Αγαπάς Πολύ (That You Love Me Very Much) Apostoleas Loukakis (Music composed by Pritanis)

2013Ντου Γιου Λοβ Μι (Do You Love Me) Mithridatis (Music composed by Mithridatis & Prophet Of Noise)Ανομολόγητα (The Ones That Shouldn't Be Said) Etsi De with Dimitris Mentzelos (Music composed by Filippos Gemelas & Dimitris Mountzourakis (Etsi De)Αυτός Που Σε Σπάει (The One Who Beats You) Apostoleas Loukakis (Music composed by Pritanis) Το Δικό Μου Hip Hop (My Hip Hop) SMA with Dimitris Mentzelos and Expe (Music composed by DJ Space(SMA)Μόνο Εσύ (Only You) Mithridatis VS Christiana (Music Composed by DJ S & Kostas Haritodiplomenos)Rock Rap Heavy Dimitris Mentzelos & Prejudice Reborn (Music Composed by Kanellopoulos/Konstas)

2014La Strada Dimitris Mentzelos & Prejudice Reborn (Music composed by Prejudice Reborn) Η Νύφη (The Bride) Mithridatis & Trendy HooliGuns (Music composed by Trendy HooliGuns) Σπιτουλίνι Αραχτουλίνι (Resting At Home) Mithridatis (Music composed by DJ Tyler(Professional Sinnerz)

2015Μόνο Κρέας (Meat Only) TRIPA Crew feat. Pritanis (Music composed by Pritanis) Έχω Πάρει Φωτιά (I'm On Fire) Dimitris Mentzelos feat. Tasos Krokodeilos & Mavros Ilos (Music composed by DJ Tyler (Professional Sinnerz)#GoogleDatShit Imiskoumbria, Sexpyr, Stereo Mike, Disastah, Sfalma, Mavros Ilos, TRIPA Crew & QB Mix (LA KLiKARiA) (Music composed by Pritanis)

2016Έτσι Το Κάνουμε Εμείς (This Is How We Do It) D-Light feat. Dimitris Mentzelos

2017Γλυκιά Ολντ'Σκουλιά (Sweet Old School) Mithridatis (Music Composed by DJ Tyler & Gerasimos Lavranos) Scream Your Lungs Out Dimitris Mentzelos & Prejudice Reborn feat. Donald D (Music Composed by Prejudice Reborn, Scratches & Sampling by DJ Funkonami) Έρχεται Καλοκαίρι Καυτό (Hot Summer On The Way) Stelios MC feat. Dimitris Mentzelos (Music Composed by Stelios MC) Party Made In Κρήτη (Party Made In Crete) Al Yaida & Dimitris Mentzelos feat. Gogo Lidaki Ace Of Spades Dimitris Mentzelos & Prejudice Reborn Frankenstein (Chapter 1-The Creator) Dimitris Mentzelos & Prejudice Reborn

2018 Οι Δρόμοι (The Streets) Dr. Dreez (Music co-produced by Mithridatis) El Gato Loco Dimitris Mentzelos feat. Markos Koumaris Το Λάθος Άτομο (The Wrong Person) Mithridatis

2019Comics Dimitris Mentzelos Darth Mith'' Mithridatis

1996 establishments in Greece
2016 disestablishments in Greece
Musical groups established in 1996
Musical groups disestablished in 2016
Greek hip hop groups
Musical groups from Athens